Cailleux is a lunar impact crater that is attached to the southwest rim of the walled plain Poincaré. It is located in the southern part of the Moon's far side, and cannot be seen from the Earth. To the southeast of Cailleux is the crater Lyman, and nearly due westward is Prandtl.

This crater is named after the late French scientist André de Cayeux de Senarpont who used the pseudonym of André Cailleux for all his published materials.

The crater is circular and symmetrical, with a worn rim and inner wall that is marked by a number of tiny craterlets. Most of the inner wall slopes gently down to the interior floor, and lacks terraces or other detail. At the bottom the floor is level and relatively featureless, with only a few tiny craters to mark the surface.

References

 
 
 
 
 
 
 
 
 
 
 
 

Impact craters on the Moon